The Yabog (Yacimientos-Bolivian Gulf) pipeline is a natural gas pipeline. The pipeline was commissioned in 1972.

History
A contract concerning the Yabog pipeline between the Government of Bolivia and oil companies YPFB and Gulf Oil was signed in August 1968. Financing for the project was provided by the World Bank and US private firms. Construction began in 1970, and the pipeline began operating in 1972.

Technical features
The Bolivian section is operated by Transredes, a subsidiary of YPFB, and the Argentinian section is operated by Transportadora de Gas del Norte, a subsidiary of Gasinvest S.A.

See also

 Gasoducto del Noreste Argentino
 Cruz del Sur pipeline
 GasAndes Pipeline
 Paraná–Uruguaiana pipeline
 Natural gas in Bolivia

References

Energy infrastructure completed in 1972
Natural gas pipelines in Argentina
Natural gas pipelines in Bolivia
Argentina–Bolivia relations